"Sleeping Sun" is a power ballad and the fourth single by Finnish symphonic metal band Nightwish. It was released as a maxi single with three other songs on 2 August 1999 to coincide with the total solar eclipse that would occur on 11 August.

Later that same year, the band's 1998 album Oceanborn was reissued with the song added to the track listing, and it has been on every edition of the album since. In 2004, it was included on Nightwish's first compilation album Tales from the Elvenpath, and in 2005, a re-recorded version was released to promote Highest Hopes: The Best of Nightwish, another compilation released on 27 September that same year.

"Sleeping Sun" was certified with Gold Disc in Finland with more than 5.000 copies sold, and also in Germany with more than 15.000 copies. It reached the number-two spot in the Finnish charts, and was #69 in the German Official Singles Charts.

Track listing

Music video
A music video was shot for the song, in which lead vocalist Tarja Turunen seems to have red hair. The videoclip includes many landscapes characteristic of Finland, for example the forests, the beaches and a large grain field. The video was directed by Sami Käyhkö and shot at Ivalo and Lake Inari, Finland, in July 1999.

When the song was re-recorded in 2005, another video was made, showing Turunen as a valkyrie walking along a battlefield filled with dead and wounded soldiers, played by the other band members, as they are being led away.

Crew
 Director: Sami Käyhkö
 Producer: Paula Eronen
 Executive producer: Sami Manninen
 Cinematographer: Risto Laasonen
 Camera assistant: Kalle Pekkala
 Trip and organizer: Juha Virtala
 Makeup and costumes: Johanna Pulli
 Grip assistant: Esko Virtala, Ville Kyro
 Offline editors: Sami Käyhkö, Reko Turja
 Telecine colourist: Adam Vidovic
 Online and compositing: Sami Käyhkö, Reko Turja

Personnel
 Tarja Turunen – vocals
 Tuomas Holopainen – keyboards
 Emppu Vuorinen – guitars
 Jukka Nevalainen – drums
 Sami Vänskä - bass guitar

Covers
German Dramatic Dark rock band ApoVelation released a demo version in 2006.
Spanish Gothic metal band Iris covered the song in 2007.
Maryana Borak sang the song Live in Novy Rozdil, Ukraine, 2007.
Soprano Maria Lund recorded a Finnish-language version of the song (titled ) for her 2008 album "Ajan Sävel".
Classical string quartet group "The Random Quartet" also played the song in 2008. Brazilian Rock band Swianne currently perform the song regularly in their concerts. New Mexico-based acoustic duo Chile Pi included it in their album "Out in New Mexico" in 2017.

2005 re-recorded version

In 2005, Nightwish announced that they were busy recording a new version of "Sleeping Sun" for a compilation album titled Highest Hopes: The Best of Nightwish. Tarja Turunen sang lead vocals on the re-recorded version, this becoming her final studio contribution to the band before being replaced by Anette Olzon. To promote the compilation, it was released as both a CD and a DVD single.

The CD single included the full 2005 version, the radio edit of this new version, and the original 1999 version.

The DVD single included two music videos, one for each version of the song.

Track listing

CD single
 "Sleeping Sun" (2005 radio edit) – 4:06
 "Sleeping Sun" (2005 full version) – 4:27
 "Sleeping Sun" (original version) – 4:03

DVD single
 "Sleeping Sun" (2005 version, music video) – 4:11
 "Sleeping Sun" (2000 version, music video) – 4:05
 "Sleeping Sun" (live at Summer Breeze Open Air, 2002) – 4:40

Personnel
Tarja Turunen – vocals
Tuomas Holopainen – keyboards
Emppu Vuorinen – guitars
Marko Hietala – bass guitar
Jukka Nevalainen – drums

References

Metal-Rules.com: Interview with Nightwish - Tuomas Holopainen

External links
More info about Sleeping Sun: 1999 2005
Pictures from the second video

1999 singles
2005 singles
Heavy metal ballads
Nightwish songs
Number-one singles in Finland
Songs written by Tuomas Holopainen
Spinefarm Records singles
1999 songs